Captain Hiroshi Imazato was born in Nagasaki on September 24, 1896. He graduated from the Etajima Naval Academy in November 1917, and then went to the Torpedo School at the Yokosuka Naval Arsenal.  He later specialized in submarines, and became commander of the 20th Submarine Division in November 1939.

On August 11, 1941, he became commander of the 1st Submarine Division and switched to the 2nd Submarine Division in February 1942. He eventually became commander of Hokoku Maru on August 25, 1942 and was killed in an engagement on November 11, 1942 in the Indian Ocean. He was promoted to Rear-Admiral posthumously.

1896 births
1942 deaths
Japanese admirals of World War II
Japanese military personnel killed in World War II
People from Nagasaki
Imperial Japanese Naval Academy alumni